Brian Alan Holzinger (born October 10, 1972) is an American former professional ice hockey center. He played in the National Hockey League with the Buffalo Sabres, Tampa Bay Lightning, Pittsburgh Penguins and the Columbus Blue Jackets.

Playing career
Holzinger was drafted in the sixth round, 124th overall, by the Buffalo Sabres in the 1991 NHL Entry Draft. He played High School Hockey at Padua Franciscan High School in Parma, Ohio and four years of college hockey at Bowling Green State University, and was the recipient of the Hobey Baker Award for top men's collegiate hockey player during his senior season.  He made his National Hockey League debut with the Sabres during the 1994–95 season, appearing in four regular season games and four playoff games (scoring two goals during the Sabres' playoff series against the Philadelphia Flyers). After four and a half seasons with the Sabres, he was traded at the trade deadline of the 1999–2000 season (along with Cory Sarich and Wayne Primeau) to the Tampa Bay Lightning in exchange for Chris Gratton and a second-round draft pick.

In his first full season with the Lightning in 2000–01, Holzinger posted 36 points in 70 games. The following 2001–02 season, Brian was hampered by a shoulder injury that limited him to only 23 games. A broken leg suffered just prior to the 2002–03 season ensured Holzinger was again on the sidelines for the first half of the year. After being nursed back to health by his wife Jenna, Holzinger was traded at the trade deadline, this time to the Pittsburgh Penguins in exchange for Marc Bergevin. In the 2003–04 season, once again at the trade deadline, the Penguins traded Holzinger to the Columbus Blue Jackets in exchange for Lasse Pirjetä. As a result of this trade, Holzinger was the first Ohio native to play for the Blue Jackets franchise.

In his NHL career, Holzinger appeared in 547 regular season games.  He scored 93 goals and added 145 assists.  In 52 Stanley Cup playoff games, he scored 11 goals and 18 assists.

Career statistics

Regular season and playoffs

International

Awards and honours

References

External links

1972 births
Living people
Bowling Green Falcons men's ice hockey players
Buffalo Sabres draft picks
Buffalo Sabres players
Columbus Blue Jackets players
Hobey Baker Award winners
Ice hockey players from Ohio
People from Parma, Ohio
Pittsburgh Penguins players
Rochester Americans players
Springfield Falcons players
Tampa Bay Lightning players
Compuware Ambassadors players
American men's ice hockey centers
AHCA Division I men's ice hockey All-Americans